Everett Adrian Lively (February 14, 1925 – July 12, 2015), nicknamed "Red", was a professional baseball player. He was a right-handed pitcher over parts of three seasons (1947–49) with the Cincinnati Reds. For his career, he compiled an 8–13 record, with a 4.16 earned run average, and 94 strikeouts in 249 innings pitched. He was born in Birmingham, Alabama and is the son of former Major League Baseball player Jack Lively.

Prior to his entry into Major League Baseball, Lively served in the United States Army in Europe from 1944–46. He died in Huntsville, Alabama on July 12, 2015.

See also
List of second-generation Major League Baseball players

References

External links

1925 births
2015 deaths
Cincinnati Reds players
Major League Baseball pitchers
Baseball players from Alabama
Montgomery Rebels players
Birmingham Barons players
Tulsa Oilers (baseball) players
Sherman–Denison Twins players
Jacksonville Braves players
Shreveport Sports players
Augusta Rams players
Columbus Jets players
United States Army personnel of World War II